Larinopoda lircaea, the cream pierid blue, is a butterfly in the family Lycaenidae. It is found in Nigeria (east and the Cross River loop), Cameroon, Equatorial Guinea, Gabon, the Republic of the Congo, the Central African Republic, Angola, the Democratic Republic of the Congo (Mayumbe, Mongala, Uele, Tshopo, Tshuapa and Kinshasa), Sudan and Uganda. The habitat consists of forests.

Adults are attracted to extrafloral nectaries.

References

Butterflies described in 1866
Poritiinae
Butterflies of Africa
Taxa named by William Chapman Hewitson